Parapedobacter indicus is a Gram-negative, non-spore-forming, rod-shaped and non-motile bacterium from the genus of Parapedobacter which has been isolated from soil from a hexachlorocyclohexane-contaminated dumpsite in Lucknow in India.

References

External links
Type strain of Parapedobacter indicus at BacDive -  the Bacterial Diversity Metadatabase	

Sphingobacteriia
Bacteria described in 2015